Brown Girl in the Ring may refer to:

 "Brown Girl in the Ring" (song), a traditional Jamaican children's song and ring game
 Brown Girl in the Ring (album), by B.R. Wallers
 Brown Girl in the Ring (novel), by Nalo Hopkinson